The 2009 Warrington Wolves season was the 131st in the club's history. They competed in Super League XIV as well the 2009 Challenge Cup. They reached the Challenge Cup final in which they defeated Huddersfield Giants.

Transfers
Transfers for 2009 (In)

Transfers for 2009 (Out)

Full squad

Preseason

Super League

Table

Matches

Challenge Cup

Notes

Note A: Warrington won 24-25 via the golden point rule.

External links
 Warrington Wolves' official website

Warrington Wolves seasons
Warrington Wolves season